State emblem may refer to one of the following:

National emblems
State Emblem of India
State Emblem of Pakistan
State Emblem of the Soviet Union

Sub-national emblems
One of the emblems of Indian states
One of the emblems of Malaysian states